Lattice scattering is the scattering of ions by interaction with atoms in a lattice. This effect can be qualitatively understood as phonons colliding with charge carriers.

In the current quantum mechanical picture of conductivity the ease with which electrons traverse a crystal lattice is dependent on the near perfectly regular spacing of ions in that lattice. Only when a lattice contains perfectly regular spacing can the ion-lattice interaction (scattering) lead to almost transparent behavior of the lattice.

In the quantum understanding, an electron is viewed as a wave traveling through a medium. When the wavelength of the electrons is larger than the crystal spacing, the electrons will propagate freely throughout the metal without collision.

See also
Ionized impurity scattering
Phonon scattering

References

External links

Quantum mechanics
Scattering